The 1984 Football League Cup Final (billed as the Milk Cup Final) was an association football match between Liverpool and Everton.  The initial final was a dour affair in which Liverpool had more chances but Everton saw what seemed a clear-cut penalty claim waved away by the referee when Alan Hansen used his hand to steer Adrian Heath's goal-bound shot off the Liverpool goal line. The replay was equally dour but Liverpool won the game through a first-half Graeme Souness goal at Maine Road. This was Liverpool's fourth consecutive success in the competition and also the third consecutive final in which they had defeated that season's eventual FA Cup winners.

Match details

Replay

References

External links
LFC History Match Report
LFC History Match Report (Replay)

League Cup Final 1984
League Cup Final 1984
EFL Cup Finals
League Cup Final
Football League Cup Final
Football League Cup Final
1980s in Manchester
Sports competitions in Manchester